An E number is a food additive code.

E number or E code may also refer to:

  (mathematical constant), the base of the natural logarithm
 14 (number), the number represented by hexadecimal "E"
 International E-road network, a numbering system for roads in Europe
 External Cause of Injury Codes, codes used to define the mechanism of death or injury; see List of ICD-9 codes E
 E-numbers in physics, the elements of a Clifford algebra in Arthur S. Eddington's "fundamental theory"

See also 
 E notation, the base-10 exponential notation
 E series (disambiguation)